Rakeem Haleek Christmas (born December 1, 1991) is an American professional basketball player. He played college basketball for the Syracuse Orange for four seasons before being drafted by the Minnesota Timberwolves with the 36th overall pick in the 2015 NBA draft.

After being drafted by the Timberwolves, he was traded to the Cleveland Cavaliers, who then traded him to the Indiana Pacers. He spent two seasons with the Pacers while also playing for their NBA G League team, the Fort Wayne Mad Ants. He was then waived in the 2017 offseason and went overseas to play for Galatasaray in Turkey, the New Zealand Breakers of the National Basketball League (NBL), the Magnolia Hotshots of the Philippine Basketball Association, and Ormanspor in Turkey.

High school career
Christmas attended Northeast Catholic High School in Philadelphia, Pennsylvania between 2007 and 2009, before his junior year he transferred to Academy of the New Church in Bryn Athyn, Pennsylvania. As a junior, he averaged 13.0 points, 7.5 rebounds, and 3.0 blocks per game. During his senior season, he averaged 11.0 points, 9.6 rebounds, and 3.9 blocks per game.

He was rated as  the #21 player in the class of 2011 by Scout.com. He was rated as the #27 player by Rivals.com. He was named to the Class A first team as a junior.

College career
Christmas committed to Syracuse basketball on August 6, 2010, after his junior season in high school. He started playing for Syracuse in the 2011–12 season and contributed all four seasons that he was with the team.

College statistics

College career highs
 Blocks: 6 against Loyola (11/25/14)
 Rebounds: 16 against Hampton (11/16/14)
 Points: 35 against Wake Forest (01/13/15)

Professional career

Indiana Pacers (2015–2017)
On June 25, 2015, Christmas was selected by the Minnesota Timberwolves with the 36th overall pick in the 2015 NBA draft. His rights were then traded to the Cleveland Cavaliers along with those of Cedi Osman and a future second-round pick in exchange for the rights of Tyus Jones. He later joined the Cavaliers for the 2015 NBA Summer League, where he averaged 8.0 points and 4.5 rebounds in four games. On July 23, 2015, his rights were traded again, this time to the Indiana Pacers in exchange for a 2019 second-round pick. Four days later, he signed with the Pacers. Christmas spent the majority of the 2015–16 season on assignment in the NBA Development League with the Fort Wayne Mad Ants. On January 29, 2016, he was named in the East All-Star team for the 2016 NBA D-League All-Star Game. In the Pacers' 2015–16 regular season finale, Christmas made his NBA debut, scoring four points and making both his field-goal tries off the bench in a 97–92 win over the Milwaukee Bucks. He spent more time with the Pacers in 2016–17, appearing in 29 games, but still received multiple assignments to Fort Wayne.

On July 7, 2017, Christmas was waived by the Pacers.

Galatasaray (2017)
On August 17, 2017, Christmas signed with Turkish club Galatasaray for the 2017–18 season. On November 11, 2017, he parted ways with Galatasaray.

New Zealand Breakers (2018)
On January 8, 2018, Christmas signed with the New Zealand Breakers for the rest of the 2017–18 NBL season. In 12 games, he averaged 7.5 points and 5.6 rebounds per game.

Magnolia Hotshots (2019)
On July 18, 2019, it was reported that Magnolia Hotshots had added Christmas to their roster.

Ormanspor (2019–2020)
On August 21, 2019, OGM Ormanspor announced that they had added Christmas to their roster.

Yulon Dinosours (2020–2021)
On November 3, 2020, Yulon Luxgen Dinos announced that they had added Christmas to their roster.

Cangrejeros de Santurce (2022–present)
On January 1, 2022, Christmas signed with the Cangrejeros de Santurce of the BSN.

NBA career statistics

Regular season

|-
| style="text-align:left;"| 
| style="text-align:left;"| Indiana
| 1 || 0 || 6.0 || 1.000 || .000 || .000 || 1.0 || .0 || .0 || .0 || 4.0
|-
| style="text-align:left;"| 
| style="text-align:left;"| Indiana
| 29 || 0 || 7.6 || .442 || .000 || .724 || 1.9 || .1 || .1 || .2 || 2.0
|- class="sortbottom"
| style="text-align:center;" colspan="2"| Career
| 30 || 0 || 7.5 || .467|| .000 || .724 || 1.9 || .1 || .1 || .2 || 2.1

Personal life
Christmas and his mother Landra Hamid moved to St. Croix when he was 2 years old. While he lived in the Virgin Islands, his mother died due to kidney failure at the age of 28. After his mother died, he remained in St. Croix and was raised there by his grandmother, Evelyn Hamid. When he was 13 years old he moved to Philadelphia, Pennsylvania to live with his aunt, Amira Hamid, who became his legal guardian.

Christmas was initiated as an honorary member of the Alpha Epsilon Pi fraternity during his sophomore year at Syracuse University. Christmas is thought to be the first player in Syracuse men's basketball history to finish his undergraduate degree in 3 years.

Christmas is married to Jasmine Jordan, the daughter of Michael Jordan. Their son, Rakeem Michael Christmas, was born in May 2019.

References

External links

Syracuse Orange bio

1991 births
Living people
21st-century African-American sportspeople
African-American basketball players
All-American college men's basketball players
American expatriate basketball people in China
American expatriate basketball people in New Zealand
American expatriate basketball people in the Dominican Republic
American expatriate basketball people in the Philippines
American expatriate basketball people in Taiwan
American expatriate basketball people in Turkey
American men's basketball players
Basketball players from New Jersey
Basketball players from Philadelphia
Fort Wayne Mad Ants players
Galatasaray S.K. (men's basketball) players
Indiana Pacers players
Magnolia Hotshots players
McDonald's High School All-Americans
Minnesota Timberwolves draft picks
New Zealand Breakers players
People from Irvington, New Jersey
Philippine Basketball Association imports
Power forwards (basketball)
Sportspeople from Essex County, New Jersey
Syracuse Orange men's basketball players
Yulon Luxgen Dinos players
Super Basketball League imports
Cangrejeros de Santurce basketball players
Cocodrilos de Caracas players
American expatriate basketball people in Venezuela